Frederic Dodge (April 4, 1847 – March 7, 1927) was a United States circuit judge of the United States Court of Appeals for the First Circuit and previously was a United States District Judge of the United States District Court for the District of Massachusetts.

Education and career

Born in Cambridge, Massachusetts, Dodge received a Bachelor of Arts degree from Harvard University in 1867 and a Bachelor of Laws from Harvard Law School in 1869. He was in private practice of law in Boston, Massachusetts from 1869 to 1905.

Federal judicial service

Dodge was nominated by President Theodore Roosevelt on February 15, 1905, to a seat on the United States District Court for the District of Massachusetts vacated by Judge Francis Cabot Lowell. He was confirmed by the United States Senate on February 23, 1905, and received his commission the same day. His service terminated on September 10, 1912, due to his elevation to the First Circuit.

Dodge was nominated by President William Howard Taft on July 10, 1912, to a seat on the United States Court of Appeals for the First Circuit vacated by Judge William Schofield. He was confirmed by the Senate on July 23, 1912, and received his commission the same day. His service terminated on June 30, 1918, due to his resignation.

Death

Dodge died on March 7, 1927, in Belmont, Massachusetts.

References

Sources
 

1847 births
1927 deaths
Judges of the United States District Court for the District of Massachusetts
United States district court judges appointed by Theodore Roosevelt
20th-century American judges
Judges of the United States Court of Appeals for the First Circuit
United States court of appeals judges appointed by William Howard Taft
Harvard Law School alumni
Lawyers from Cambridge, Massachusetts
Harvard College alumni